Petarukan is a district in Pemalang Regency, Central Java, Indonesia. Petarukan district contains 1 urban village (kelurahan) and 19 rural villages (desa).

Geography 
Petarukan is located on the northern coast of the Java Sea with an altitude of 0 – 7 m.

The boundaries of the District of Petarukan, Pemalang are as follows :

Villages

References

External links 

Villages in Central Java